Farmers Club is a historic clubhouse located at Seymour, Jackson County, Indiana.  It was built in 1914, and is a -story, Beaux-Arts style brick building with Indiana limestone embellishments.  The main entrance features flanking Ionic order columns, round arch transom, and projecting piers. The building houses the local chamber of commerce.

It was listed on the National Register of Historic Places in 1983. It is located in the Seymour Commercial Historic District.

References

Clubhouses on the National Register of Historic Places in Indiana
Beaux-Arts architecture in Indiana
Buildings and structures completed in 1914
Buildings and structures in Jackson County, Indiana
National Register of Historic Places in Jackson County, Indiana
Historic district contributing properties in Indiana